Ameh Ebute  (born 16 May 1946) is a Nigerian lawyer and politician. He was the President of the Nigerian Senate during the end of the Third Republic.

References

1946 births
Living people
Presidents of the Senate (Nigeria)
People from Benue State
20th-century Nigerian lawyers